4 From the Village is an EP by the Anglo-Icelandic band Fields. The EP was released via Black Lab Recordings on July 10, 2006.

Track listing

Personnel
Nick Peill – vocals, acoustic guitar, keyboards
Thorunn Antonia – vocals, keyboards, synths
Henry Spenner – vocals, drums
Matty Derham – bass guitar
Jamie Putnam – electric guitar
Dan Gretch-Marguerat – producer, mixer
Jim Abbiss – producer, mixer for "Brittlesticks"

References

2006 EPs
Fields (band) albums